The Africa Movie Academy Award for Best Film is an annual merit by the Africa Film Academy to recognise the best African films of the preceding year. It was known as the Best Picture award from 2005 to 2011.

References

Best Film Africa Movie Academy Award winners
Africa Movie Academy Awards
Awards for best film